The Diamond HK36 Super Dimona is an extensive family of Austrian low-wing, T-tailed, two-seat motor gliders that were designed by Wolf Hoffmann and currently produced by Diamond Aircraft Industries.

Design and development
The series started with the Hoffmann H36 Dimona, a touring motorglider introduced in the early 1980s. The aircraft were initially produced by Hoffmann Flugzeugbau, which became HOAC Flugzeugwerk and later Diamond Aircraft Industries.

Built entirely from fibreglass, the H36 family all use a Wortmann FX 63-137 airfoil. The wings feature top-surface Schempp-Hirth-style airbrakes. Optionally, the wings can be folded by two people in a few minutes to allow storage. The original H36 has  wings, while the later members of the family added slightly greater span. Cockpit accommodation seats two in side-by-side configuration, under a hinged bubble canopy that is pushed up and backwards.

The series are type certified in Europe and North America. The H36 received its US Federal Aviation Administration certification on 9 July 1986. Due to its fibreglass construction, the US certification includes the restriction "All external portions of the glider exposed to sunlight must be painted white except of (sic) wing tips, nose of fuselage and rudder."

In March 1987 an improved variant was developed by Dieter Köhler and the subsequent HK36R first flew with a Limbach L2400 engine in October 1989.

When equipped with the larger available engines, particularly the  Rotax 914 turbocharged powerplant, the aircraft can be used for glider towing. A commercial success, more than 900 H36s and HK36s have been completed.

The HK36 provided the basis from which the Diamond DV20 Katana from which the improved DA20 and four-seat DA40 series were later developed.

Operational history
The record held until surpassed in 2002 by the Bohannon B-1.

The FCD (Fuel Cell Demonstrator) was a project led by Boeing that used a Diamond HK36 Super Dimona motor glider as a testbed for a fuel cell-powered light airplane research project. The project achieved level flight using fuel cells only in February and March 2008.

In December 2016 there were nine H36s and thirty HK36s registered with the US FAA, two HK36Rs and two HK36TTSs registered with Transport Canada, along with seven H36s and eight HK36s registered with the UK Civil Aviation Authority.

Variants
H36 Dimona

HK36 R Super Dimona
Developed from the H36, with a carbon-fibre spar, modified fuselage,  wingspan and  Rotax 912A engine.
HK36TS Super Dimona
Developed from the HK36 R Super Dimona, the HK36TS has a  Rotax 912 A3 engine,  wingspan, 28:1 glide ratio and conventional landing gear. Marketed as the Katana Xtreme in Canada and the USA.
HK36TC Super Dimona
The HK36TC has a  Rotax 912 A3 engine. Marketed as the Katana Xtreme in Canada and the USA.

HK36TC-100 Super Dimona
The HK36TC-100 has a  Rotax 912 S3 engine. Minimum sink rate: 1.18 m/s at 97 km/h, glide ratio 1:27 at 105 km/h Marketed as the Katana Xtreme in Canada and the USA.
HK36TTS Super Dimona
The HK36TTS has an  Rotax 914 F3 or F4 turbocharged engine, a Muhlbauer MTV-21-A-C-F/CF 175-05 propeller,  wingspan, 28:1 glide ratio, and conventional landing gear. Marketed as the Katana Xtreme in Canada and the USA.

HK36TTC Super Dimona
The HK36TTC has an  Rotax 914 F3 or F4 turbocharged engine,  wingspan, 28:1 glide ratio, and tricycle landing gear. Marketed as the Katana Xtreme in Canada and the USA.
HK36TTC Eco Dimona
Special mission version of the HK36 for the surveillance role, it is equipped with a gimbal-mounted Wescam camera and cockpit display, an  Rotax 914 F3 or F4 turbocharged engine and a Muhlbauer MTV-21-A-C-F/CF 175-05 propeller. Marketed as the Multi Purpose Xtreme in Canada.
Diamond DA36 E-Star
Developed by Siemens, EADS and Diamond Aircraft to reduce fuel consumption and emissions by up to 25 percent, using a serial hybrid drive that turns the aircraft's prop with a Siemens  electric motor, from power generated by a  Austro Engines Wankel rotary engine and generator, stored in batteries. The prototype first flew 8 June 2011.
Hoffmann H38 Observer
A surveillance aircraft largely based on the H36 Dimona which failed to enter flight testing due to failure of the partnership between Wolf Hoffmann and Hoffmann Flugzeugbau.

Operators

 Indian Air Force

Specifications (Hoffmann H36 Dimona)

See also

References

External links

1980s United States sailplanes
HK36
T-tail aircraft
Low-wing aircraft
Single-engined tractor aircraft
Motor gliders
Aircraft first flown in 1989